The MOFO Project/Object is an album by Frank Zappa. The album was announced by the Zappa Family Trust in mid-2006. It commemorates the 40th anniversary of Zappa's first album, Freak Out!. It documents the making of Freak Out! featuring previously unreleased material.  It was released as a uniquely packaged 4-CD set.  It is project/object #1 in a series of 40th Anniversary FZ Audio Documentaries.

A more affordable 2-CD set was also released. CD2 tracks 2, 5, 11, 12, 13, 15 & 16 are unique to this 2-CD set release (these seven tracks do not appear on the four-disc box set). All the other tracks are available on The MOFO Project/Object 4-CD set.

The first CD of each set includes the original 1966 vinyl mix of Freak Out!. This mix has a shorter kazoo outro on "Who Are The Brain Police?"

Track listing

4-CD version 
Disc 1
Original 1966 Stereo LP Mix of Freak Out!

None of these tracks have previously appeared in any format outside the Vault other than the configuration offered herein.

2-CD version 

Disc 1
Original 1966 Stereo LP Mix of Freak Out!

Credits 
• Arthur Maebe 
• Benjamin Barrett 
• Bob Stone - Remixing 
• Carl Franzoni 
• Carol Kaye 
• Chris Riess - Liner Notes 
• Dave Wells 
• David Anderle 
• David Fricke - Liner Notes 
• Doug Sax - Remastering 
• Edgard Varèse - Author 
• Elliot Ingber - Guitar, Guitar (Rhythm) 
• Emmet Sargeant 
• Eugene Dinovi 
• Frank Zappa - Arranger, Art Direction, Author, Conductor, Executive Producer, Orchestration, Percussion, Producer, Remixing, Text 
• Gail Zappa - Producer 
• Gene Estes - Percussion 
• George Price 
• Jack Anesh - Cover Design 
• Jim Black - Drums, Percussion, Vocals 
• Joe Travers - Producer, Vault Research 
• John "Snakehips" Johnson 
• John Polito - Audio Restoration, Mastering 
• John Rotella 
• Joseph Saxon 
• Ken Watson - Percussion 
• Kim Fowley 
• Kurt Reher 
• Melanie Starks - Production Coordination 
• Mothers Auxiliary 
• Neil Levang 
• Paul Bergstrom 
• Plas Johnson 
• Ray Collins - Finger Cymbals, Hair Stylist, Harmonica, Tambourine, Vocals 
• Ray Leong - Cover Photo 
• Raymond Kelley (cello) 
• Roy Caton 
• Roy Estrada - Bass, Guitarron, Soprano (Vocal) 
• Sangwook "Sunny" Nam - Remastering 
• Stan Agol - Remixing 
• Terry Gilliam 
• Tom Wilson - Producer 
• Tracy Veal - Art Direction, Layout Design 
• Val Valentine - Engineering Director 
• Virgil Evans

Notes and references

External links 
 Official Zappa website - album info
 The Zappa Patio - Detailed analysis and fanatical opinions

Compilation albums published posthumously
Frank Zappa compilation albums
2006 compilation albums
The Mothers of Invention albums
Zappa Records albums